George Butlin (11 July 1861 – 10 July 1925) was a New Zealand cricketer. He played one first-class match for Otago in 1889/90. Butlin was born in England and worked as a commercial clerk.

References

External links
 

1861 births
1925 deaths
New Zealand cricketers
Otago cricketers
People from St Pancras, London
Cricketers from Greater London